The 1942 George Washington Colonials football team was an American football team that represented George Washington University in the Southern Conference during the 1942 college football season. In its first and only season under head coach Johnny Baker, the team compiled a 3–6 record (2–4 against conference opponents), finished in 12th place in the Southern Conference, and was outscored by a total of 149 to 62. After the 1942 season, the school did not field another football team until 1946.

Schedule

References

George Washington
George Washington Colonials football seasons
George Washington Colonials football